Who Can Know It? is the ninth studio album by American rock band Showbread. The album was released on November 16, 2010 through non-profit record label Come&Live!. Who Can Know It? was produced by Sylvia Massy, who had previously produced Showbread's albums No Sir, Nihilism Is Not Practical, Age of Reptiles and The Fear of God. This is the band's first album to be funded completely by fans and released as a free download.

Track listing
 "A Man with a Hammer"
 "I Never Liked Anyone and I'm Afraid of People"
 "Dear Music"
 "Deliverance"
 "The Prison Comes Undone"
 "Hydra"
 "Myth of a Christian Nation"
 "You're Like a Taxi"
 "Time to Go"
 "The Heart Is Deceitful Above All Things"

Bonus tracks
 "Only Jesus Loves You More Than I Do" (demo) 
 "The Drain" (Demo) 
 "Minamata Disease" 
 "Deliverance" (Acoustic) 
 "It Is Well with My Soul"

Personnel
 Josh Dies – lead vocals, guitar, synthesizer, piano, bass, programming
 Garrett Holmes – guitar, synthesizer, piano, bass, vocals
 Patrick Porter – bass guitar, guitar, synthesizer, piano, vocals
 Drew Porter – drums and percussion, synthesizer, guitar
 Rich Veltrop – producer, engineering, mixing, additional harmony arrangements
 Sylvia Massy – producer

References

2010 albums
Showbread (band) albums
Albums free for download by copyright owner
Albums produced by Sylvia Massy